National Route 108 is a national highway of Japan connecting Ishinomaki, Miyagi and Yurihonjō, Akita in Japan, with a total length of .

History
Route 108 was originally designated on 18 May 1953 as a route from Ishinomaki to Shinbori (now Sakata) via Furukawa (now Osaki). On 1 April 1963 the route was shortened to Furukawa and rerouted to Yokote, replacing Route 109; the original route to Sakata was incorporated into Route 47. On 1 April 1970 the northern terminus was moved to Honjo (now Yurihonjō).

References

External links

108
Roads in Akita Prefecture
Roads in Miyagi Prefecture